Spampinato is an Italian surname that may refer to
Giovanni Spampinato (1946–1972), Italian investigative journalist 
Joey Spampinato (born 1948), American rock musician
The Spampinato Brothers, a rock band from Cape Cod, Massachusetts, U.S. 
Vincenzo Spampinato (born 1953), Italian pop-rock singer-songwriter, composer and lyricist

Italian-language surnames